Lucky Grandma is a 2019 American independent comedy-drama film written and directed by Sasie Sealy, co-written by Angela Cheng, and starring Tsai Chin. Lucky Grandma is the director's debut feature film.

Plot
In New York City's Chinatown, a Chinese chain smoking grandma spends her time at the casinos but ends up in deep trouble.

Cast
Tsai Chin as Grandma
Hsiao-Yuan Ha as Big Pong
Michael Tow as Little Handsome
Woody Fu as Pock-Mark
Eddie Yu as Howard
Mason Yam as David

Reception

Critical reception 
On the review aggregator website Rotten Tomatoes, it has  approval rating. Critics' consensus is "Lucky Grandma gives Tsai Chin a long-overdue opportunity to shine in a leading role -- but it's audiences who are the truly fortunate ones."

Awards and nominations

References

External links

American independent films
Films shot in New York City
Films set in New York City
Films about old age
Films about families
2019 independent films
Comedy-drama films about Asian Americans
2019 comedy-drama films
Films about Chinese Americans
Chinese-language American films
2010s American films